Be Careful What You Don't Wish For is the  second album by Nottingham-based project Twelve.

Track listing

"Ahoi Kaptain"
"Rising Early makes The Road Long"
"I Hung A Stone Around Our Love"
"Plasma Reprise"
"Nothing here Is Like it Seems"
"Airlock"
"Annie's Tune"
"The Rest Of My Life"
"Photographic Memories"
"Walking Drunk" (With Murray Wilson)
"The Anal Gunshot"
"So Long"
"Are You Recording Me?"
"Find A Way Back Home"
"All The Same"

External links
Album press release
Audio Clips
Official Twelve Page
Chris Olley's web site
Twelve's MySpace page

2003 albums
Chris Olley albums